Utilitarian is the fourteenth studio album by British grindcore band Napalm Death. It was released in the UK on 27 February 2012 and globally on 28 February 2012.

The magazine Loudwire named it as second best metal album of 2012.

Background
Utilitarian was recorded in 2011. A 7" vinyl single for "Analysis Paralysis" was released in January 2012. When asked, vocalist Mark "Barney" Greenway stated that he was quite proud of the new album, saying, "The thing you have to consider about Napalm Death is that no two albums sound the same, which is what makes this album unique. Whilst we stick to the same aggressive tone that fans are used to, we also have added other technical elements in it to make it stand out. It's still a rock album, but it's something we do to it to make it fresh."

When the recording sessions for the then-untitled album had already finished, Napalm Death extended their worldwide contract with Century Media on a number of future albums. According to vocalist Mark Greenway, "it's the first time we've actually re-signed on a longer term deal with anybody since the days when we didn't strictly know that we could be digging ourselves a big hole with labels."

Track listing

Personnel

Napalm Death
Barney Greenway – lead vocals
Mitch Harris – guitars, backing vocals
Shane Embury – bass
Danny Herrera – drums

Additional personnel
John Zorn – saxophone ("Everyday Pox")
Russ Russell – production, mixing, engineering, recording, mastering
Marc Urselli – engineering ("Everyday Pox")
Frode Sylthe – artwork, layout
Cindy Frey – band photos

Chart positions

References

2012 albums
Napalm Death albums
Century Media Records albums